Perverzion is a novel written by Ukrainian author Yuri Andrukhovych.   The novel is considered to be part of Ukrainian post-modernist literature.  It was originally written in 1997 in Ukrainian but was translated into English by Michael M. Naydan and published in 2005. The book was published by Northwestern University Press, . It tells the tragicomic last days of a poet in Venice.

See also

 List of Ukrainian-language poets
 List of Ukrainian-language writers
 Ukrainian literature

Ukrainian-language books
1997 novels
Ukrainian novels
Postmodern novels
Novels set in Venice